Borstal Boy is a 2000 romantic drama film directed by Peter Sheridan, based on the 1958 autobiographical novel of the same name by Brendan Behan.

Plot
In 1941, 16-year-old IRA volunteer Brendan Behan (Shawn Hatosy) is going on a bombing mission from Ireland to Liverpool during the Second World War. His mission is thwarted when he is apprehended, charged and imprisoned in a borstal, a reform institution for young offenders in East Anglia, England. At borstal, Brendan is forced to live face-to-face with those he regarded as his enemies, a confrontation that reveals a deep inner conflict in the young Brendan and forces a self-examination that is both traumatic and revealing. Events take an unexpected turn and Brendan is thrown into a complete spin. In the emotional vortex, he finally faces up to the truth.

Cast
 Shawn Hatosy as Brendan Behan
 Danny Dyer as Charlie Milwall
 Lee Ingleby as Dale
 Michael York as Joyce
 Eva Birthistle as Liz Joyce
 Mark Huberman as Mac
 Ian McElhinney as Verreker
 Ronnie Drew as Customs

External links
 
 
 
 
 New York Times review
 LA Times review

2000 films
2000s biographical films
2000s coming-of-age films
2000 independent films
2000 LGBT-related films
2000 romantic drama films
2000s teen drama films
2000s teen romance films
British biographical films
British coming-of-age films
British independent films
British LGBT-related films
British prison drama films
British romantic drama films
British teen drama films
British teen romance films
Coming-of-age drama films
Coming-of-age romance films
Drama films based on actual events
English-language Irish films
Films about the Irish Republican Army
Films based on autobiographical novels
Films based on Irish novels
Gay-related films
Irish biographical films
Irish coming-of-age films
Irish independent films
Irish LGBT-related films
Irish romantic drama films
Irish teen films
LGBT-related romantic drama films
LGBT-related coming-of-age films
LGBT-related films based on actual events
Romance films based on actual events
British teen LGBT-related films
2000s English-language films
2000s British films
Teen LGBT-related films